Alexander Chow (simplified Chinese: 曹荣锦; traditional Chinese: 曹榮錦; pinyin: Cáo Róngjǐn) is a Chinese American theologian. He is Senior Lecturer in Theology and World Christianity and co-director of Centre for the Study of World Christianity at New College, University of Edinburgh. His research interests include contextual theology, Christianity in China, Chinese philosophy and religion, public theology, and digital theology.

Biography
Born and raised in Southern California, he completed a MA in biblical studies and theology at Fuller Theological Seminary in 2006 and a MTh in theology at Regent College in 2008. He finished his PhD in theology in 2012 at the University of Birmingham, supervised under Edmond Tang. He then spent a year in the School of Liberal Arts at Renmin University of China as a postdoctoral fellow. He joined the University of Edinburgh as a Chancellor Fellow in September 2013. He is now senior lecturer in theology and world Christianity and co-director of Centre for the Study of World Christianity.

He is an editor of the journal Studies in World Christianity and the Liu Institute Series in Chinese Christianities of Notre Dame Press. He is also the chair of Chinese Christianities Program Unit at American Academy of Religion.

Writings

Edited Works 
Chow, Alexander (Ed.). Scottish Missions to China: Commemorating the Legacy of James Legge (1815-1897). Leiden: Brill, 2022. ISBN 9789004509634
Chow, Alexander and Easten Law (Eds). Ecclesial Diversity in Chinese Christianity. Cham: Palgrave Macmillan, 2021. 
Chow, Alexander and Emma Wild-Wood (Eds). Ecumenism and Independency in World Christianity Historical Studies in Honour of Brian Stanley. Leiden: Brill, 2020.

Monographs 
Chinese Public Theology: Generational Shifts and Confucian Imagination in Chinese Christianity (Oxford University Press, 2018). 
Theosis, Sino-Christian Theology and the Second Chinese Enlightenment (Palgrave Macmillan, 2013 ; Chinese edition: Institute of Sino-Christian Studies, 2015)

References

External links

 

Fuller Theological Seminary alumni
Regent College alumni
Alumni of the University of Birmingham 
Academic staff of Renmin University of China
Academics of the University of Edinburgh
World Christianity scholars
American theologians
Living people
Year of birth missing (living people)
Scholars of Chinese religions
American people of Chinese descent